Dave Lewis (born 29 April 1989 in Manchester) is an English rugby union footballer, currently playing in the Gallagher Premiership for Harlequins. He plays as a scrum half.

Personal life
He was educated at St Michael's Tawstock, Blundell's School, Ivybridge Community College and finally at Hartpury College.
Lewis grew up in Barnstaple and played for Barnstaple at youth level.

Club career
Lewis was a product of the academy system at Exeter Chiefs when they were playing in the RFU Championship, Lewis joined Gloucester in 2007.

Lewis' first appearance for Gloucester was in the 07/08 season at home to Worcester when he came on for 7 minutes. His breakthrough season was the 08/09 season. He made 11 appearances and just as he was starting to establish himself in the starting line up he suffered an injury (broken leg) at home to London Irish in January. He returned to the Gloucester side for the final game of the season at London Wasps before joining up with the England under 20s for the Under 20s World Cup in Japan. From then he has been a prominent player for Gloucester but has had to battle with Rory Lawson for the scrum-half berth at Kingsholm.

It was announced on 14 February 2013 that Lewis would be rejoining Exeter Chiefs from the 2013-14 season. On 8 January 2015, Lewis signed a two-year contract extension with Exeter until the end of the 2016-17 season.

On 6 February 2017, Lewis signed for Premiership rivals Harlequins from the 2017-18 season.

International career
On 25 January 2014, Lewis made his international debut for England Saxons, as a replacement, losing to Ireland Wolfhounds at 8-14.

References

External links
Gloucester Rugby profile
Exeter Chiefs profile

1989 births
Living people
People educated at Blundell's School
English rugby union players
Gloucester Rugby players
Moseley Rugby Football Club players
Rugby union players from Manchester
Rugby union scrum-halves